Sonic Temple Art & Music Festival is a rock festival held in Columbus, Ohio, United States at the Historic Crew Stadium (formerly Mapfre Stadium; renamed in 2020). The inaugural festival was held in May 2019, replacing the previously annual Rock on the Range. Sonic Temple was to return in 2020, but was cancelled due to the COVID-19 pandemic, which put the festival on hiatus until 2023.

History
In 2018, it was announced by Danny Wimmer Presents that their former Rock on the Range festival, held in Columbus, Ohio, United States at Mapfre Stadium (renamed to Historic Crew Stadium in 2020), would be replaced by the Sonic Temple Art & Music Festival at the same location. The inaugural festival was held in May 2019 with sold-out crowds of 120,000.

In December 2019, the full lineup for Sonic Temple 2020 was revealed. Metallica were to headline both Friday and Sunday night, with Slipknot headlining on Saturday. Other performers were to include Deftones, Bring Me the Horizon, Evanescence, Sublime with Rome, Rancid, Dropkick Murphys, Cypress Hill, Pennywise, Royal Blood, The Pretty Reckless, Alter Bridge, Anthrax, Flatbush Zombies, Pop Evil, Hellyeah, Ghostemane, Suicidal Tendencies, Testament, Dance Gavin Dance, Ice Nine Kills, Sleeping with Sirens, The Darkness, Knocked Loose, Code Orange, Power Trip, Saint Asonia, Dirty Honey, Jinjer, City Morgue, Bones UK, Airbourne, Fire from the Gods, Dinosaur Pile-Up, Des Rocs, Counterfeit, Crobot, Cherry Bomb, DED, Goodbye June, Brutus, 3Teeth, BRKN Love, Killstation, Brass Against, Crown Lands, Ego Kill Talent, Dregg, Bloodywood, and Zero 9:36, with more to have been announced.

In February 2020, it was announced that Metallica would be replaced as headliners by the Red Hot Chili Peppers on Friday and Tool on Sunday following frontman James Hetfield's entrance into a rehabilitation program for substance abuse. The following month, however, the festival was cancelled due to the COVID-19 pandemic. In February 2021, it was announced that it would once again be cancelled due to the ongoing pandemic. No further announcements were made and an event was again not held in 2022.

In November 2022, it was announced that after a three-year hiatus due to the pandemic, Sonic Temple would return in 2023 and be held as a four-day festival during Memorial Day weekend from May 25–28.

Events

2019 

Monster Energy Stadium Stage:
 System of a Down
 Ghost
 Halestorm
 Parkway Drive
 Beartooth
 Avatar
 Badflower

Echo Stage:
 Meshuggah
 Black Label Society
 Bad Wolves
 Zeal & Ardor
 Wage War
 SHVPES
 The Jacks

Wave Stage:
 Tom Morello
 Pussy Riot
 Ho99o99
 Cleopatrick
 Hands Like Houses
 Radattack

SiriusXM Comedy & Spoken Word Tent:
 Henry Rollins
 Tom Morello
 Shapel Lacy
 Nadya

Monster Energy Stadium Stage:
 Disturbed
 Papa Roach
 Lamb of God
 In This Moment
 Gojira
 Fever 333
 Black Coffee

Echo Stage:
 The Cult
 Killswitch Engage
 Architects
 The Black Dahlia Murder
 While She Sleeps
 Evan Konrad
 The Plot in You

Wave Stage:
 Action Bronson (did not perform due to an "unforeseen knee injury")
 Mark Lanegan Band
 Don Broco
 Movements
 Boston Manor
 No1Cares

SiriusXM Comedy & Spoken Word Tent:
 Andrew Dice Clay
 Eleanor Kerrigan
 Mark Normand
 Craig Grass

Monster Energy Stadium Stage:
 Foo Fighters
 Bring Me the Horizon (did not perform due to high winds)
 Chevelle (did not perform due to high winds)
 The Distillers (did not perform due to high winds)
 The Struts
 The Glorious Sons
 Amigo the Devil

Echo Stage:
 Joan Jett and the Blackhearts
 The Hives (performance ended early due to high winds)
 The Interrupters
 Yungblud
 Palaye Royale
 Dirty Honey
 Teenage Wrist

Wave Stage:
 Scars on Broadway (did not perform due to high winds)
 Refused (did not perform due to high winds)
 Black Pistol Fire (did not perform due to high winds)
 Basement (did not perform due to high winds)
 Scarlxrd (did not perform due to high winds)
 Demob Happy (did not perform due to high winds)

SiriusXM Comedy & Spoken Word Tent:
 Pauly Shore (did not perform due to high winds)
 Carmen Lynch (did not perform due to high winds)
 Joe Deuce (did not perform due to high winds)
 Bill Squire (did not perform due to high winds)

2023 

 Tool
 Godsmack
 Beartooth
 Bullet for My Valentine
 Pennywise
 Bad Omens
 Suicidal Tendencies
 Fever 333
 Anti-Flag
 Joey Valance & Brae
 Bones UK
 Ho99o9
 The Warning
 Oxymorrons
 Angel Dust
 Bloodywood
 Wargasm
 Malevolence
 Bastardane
 Ottto

 Avenged Sevenfold
 Queens of the Stone Age
 Chevelle
 I Prevail
 Knocked Loose
 Sleeping with Sirens
 Badflower
 Dorothy
 Black Stone Cherry
 Converge
 Born of Osiris
 Band-Maid
 Lilith Czar
 Brutus
 Des Rocs
 Fame on Fire
 Dayseeker
 Vended
 Mike's Dead

 Kiss
 Rob Zombie
 Falling in Reverse
 Puscifer
 Trivium
 Black Veil Brides
 Rival Sons
 Yelawolf Presents: Sometimes Y
 Avatar
 Senses Fail
 From Ashes to New
 Giovannie & the Hired Guns
 Mothica
 Dead Poet Society
 The Violent
 Point North
 Tallah
 Varials
 Tiger Cub
 Capital Theatre

 Foo Fighters
 Deftones
 Sublime with Rome
 Jawbreaker
 The Pretty Reckless
 Awolnation
 Nothing More
 White Reaper
 Filter
 Ayron Jones
 The Bronx
 Poorstacy
 Zero 9:36
 New Years Day
 Nova Twins
 Bob Vylan
 Aeir
 Starcrawler

References

External links
 

Heavy metal festivals in the United States
Music festivals established in 2019
Music festivals in Ohio
Rock festivals in the United States